SS Richard V. Oulahan was a Liberty ship built in the United States during World War II. She was named after Richard V. Oulahan, a Washington, D.C., correspondent for the New York Times.

Construction
Richard V. Oulahan was laid down on 26 February 1944, under a Maritime Commission (MARCOM) contract, MC hull 2297, by J.A. Jones Construction, Panama City, Florida; she was launched on 11 April 1944.

History
She was allocated to Black Diamond Steamship Co., on 11 May 1944. On 16 September 1945, she ran aground in Buckner Bay, Okinawa, during typhoon Ida. She was declared a constructive total loss (CTL) the same day and abandoned 5 November 1945. On 6 February 1948, she was sold for $100 to China Merchants and Engineers, Inc., for scrapping.

References

Bibliography

 
 
 
 
 

 

Liberty ships
Ships built in Panama City, Florida
1944 ships
Maritime incidents in September 1945